Damon Keating (born 25 July 1974) is an Australian former rugby league footballer who played as a  for the Brisbane Broncos in the Australian National Rugby League competition. He later moved to England to play for the Wakefield Trinity Wildcats in 2002.

Background
Keating was born in Brisbane, Queensland, Australia.

Playing career
While with the Brisbane Broncos, he also played for the Past Brothers in the Queensland Cup. Keating played and captained the winning Toowoomba Clydesdales in the 2001 Queensland Cup Grand Final against the Redcliffe Dolphins.

References

External links
Damon Keating Official NRL Profile
Statistics at rugbyleagueproject.org

1974 births
Living people
Australian rugby league players
Brisbane Broncos players
Past Brothers players
Rugby league props
Rugby league players from Brisbane
Toowoomba Clydesdales players
Wakefield Trinity players